Government Engineering College (GCE), Thanjavur is a government engineering college in Thanjavur, Tamilnadu, India. It was established in 2012 and offers various courses in UG in Engineering and Technology and it is accredited from UGC and it is affiliated to Anna University.

The Tamil Nadu government has announced the proposal for Government College of Engineering, Sengipatti, Thanjavur during the finance year 2012 – 13. The Institute has been built completely for 31046.8 sq feet at the cost of 49.38 crores. The college has been located on 35.73 acres

Academics 
The institute offers undergraduate courses leading to the degree of Bachelor of Engineering . The Undergraduate students are admitted through Anna university counselling based on competitive student rankings in higher secondary examination.

Departments 
 Department of Electrical and Electronics Engineering
 Department of Electronics and Communication Engineering
 Department of Computer Science and Engineering
 Department of Mechanical Engineering
 Department of Civil Engineering
 Department of Mathematics
 Department of Physics
 Department of Chemistry
 Department of English

Location 
It is located 25 km from the city of Tanjore and 35 km from the city of Trichy on Sengipatti - Gandharvakottai Main road.

References

Engineering colleges in Tamil Nadu
Educational institutions established in 2012
2012 establishments in Tamil Nadu